Thandaga is a village in Turuvekere taluk of Tumkur district in Indian state of Karnataka.

References

Tumkur district